The spangled cotinga (Cotinga cayana) is a species of bird in the family Cotingidae, the cotingas. It is found in the canopy of the Amazon Rainforest in South America.

Because of their bright, beautiful colours, cotingas have been hunted by native and colonial peoples for their feathers, as well as for food. The feathers of some species are used in making fishing flies and lures. The beauty of these birds draws birdwatchers from around the world and so may add to the local tourist economy.

Taxonomy
In 1760 the French zoologist Mathurin Jacques Brisson included a description of the spangled cotinga in his Ornithologie based on a specimen collected in Cayenne in French Guiana. He used the French name Le cotinga de Cayenne and the Latin Cotinga Cayanensis. Although Brisson coined Latin names, these do not conform to the binomial system and are not recognised by the International Commission on Zoological Nomenclature. When in 1766 the Swedish naturalist Carl Linnaeus updated his Systema Naturae for the twelfth edition, he added 240 species that had been previously described by Brisson. One of these was the spangled cotinga. Linnaeus included a brief description, coined the binomial name Ampelis cayana and cited Brisson's work. This species is now placed in the genus Cotinga that was introduced by  Brisson in 1760. The spangled cotinga is monotypic.

Description
The species is sexually dimorphic with the male being a bright turquoise-blue with a large deep wine-red throat and black to the wings, tail and back. The female is overall dull brownish-gray with darker wings and faint mottling below.

Distribution and habitat
The spangled cotinga is found throughout the Amazon Basin. It is not considered to be threatened because of its wide distribution.

Behaviour
As other members of the genus Cotinga, this species is frugivorous, but it has also been recorded feeding on insects. They are found in the upper canopy of the rainforest. Males often perch in dead trees high above the forest floor. The spangled cotinga and other members of the genus Cotinga do not sing or vocalise although they have been heard making a "whistling" sound from the wings during flight.

Gallery

References

External links
Stamps (for Suriname) with RangeMap
Spangled cotinga photo gallery VIREO
Photo-High Res-(male)—(Shows wine-red throat); Article tekipaki.jp

spangled cotinga
Birds of the Amazon Basin
Birds of the Guianas
spangled cotinga
spangled cotinga
Taxonomy articles created by Polbot